The Ukrainian Greek Catholic Archeparchy of Philadelphia is a Ukrainian Greek Catholic Church ecclesiastical territory or archeparchy of the Catholic Church in the Eastern United States. Its episcopal see is Philadelphia, Pennsylvania. The Archeparchy of Philadelphia is a metropolitan see with three suffragan eparchies in its ecclesiastical province. The Archeparchy of Philadelphia's territorial jurisdiction includes the District of Columbia, Virginia, Maryland, New Jersey, and the eastern and central portions of Pennsylvania.

The current archbishop of the archeparchy is The Right Reverend Boris Gudziak, reigning since June 4, 2019.

Ukrainian Greek Catholics in the United States were given sui iuris status as an ordinariate for the faithful of eastern rite by Pope Pius X in 1914. Prior to that, all Ukrainian Greek Catholics had been under the jurisdiction of the local Latin Church ordinary. In 1924, the status of the ordinariate was elevated to that of exarchate, known as the Apostolic Exarchate of United States of America, Faithful of the Oriental Rite (Ukrainian).  The Exarchate was then elevated to the status of Archeparchy by Pope Pius XII in 1950. In 1983, the Archeparchy lost part of its territory to the new (though still suffragan) Eparchy of St. Josaphat in Parma erected by Pope John Paul II.

, the archeparchy has approximately 13,051 Catholics and 64 parishes under its canonical jurisdiction.

Bishops

Ordinary of the United States of America
 Soter Stephen Ortynsky de Labetz, O.S.B.M. (1907–1916)

Archeparchs of Philadelphia
 Constantine Bohachevsky (1924–1961)
 Ambrozij Andrew Senyshyn, O.S.B.M. (1961–1976)
 Joseph Michael Schmondiuk (1977–1978)
 Myroslav Ivan Lubachivsky (1979–1980), appointed Coadjutor Archeparch and later Archeparch of Lviv (Ukrainian)
 Stephen Sulyk (1980–2000)
 Stephen Soroka (2000–2018)
 Borys Gudziak (2019–present)

Other priests of this eparchy who became bishops
 Jaroslav Gabro, appointed Bishop of Saint Nicholas of Chicago in 1961
 Richard Stephen Seminack, appointed Bishop of Saint Nicholas of Chicago in 2003

Auxiliary Eparchs of Philadelphia
 Ivan Bucko (1940–1945)
 Ambrozij Andrew Senyshyn, O.S.B.M. (1942–1956), appointed Eparch of Stamford 
 Joseph Michael Schmondiuk (1956–1961), appointed Eparch of Stamford 
 John Stock (1971–1972)
 Basil Harry Losten (1971–1977), appointed Eparch of Stamford 
 Robert Mikhail Moskal (1981–1983), appointed Eparch of Saint Josaphat in Parma
 Michael Kuchmiak, C.Ss.R. (1988–1989), appointed Eparch of Holy Family of London
 Wolodymyr Paska (1992–2000)
 John Bura (2006–2019)
 Andriy Rabiy (2017–present)

Cathedral
The seat of the archeparchy is the Cathedral of the Immaculate Conception, built in the style of the Hagia Sophia, and located across the street from the Archeparchy's offices. In 1979, it hosted a papal visit by Pope John Paul II, the first time a Roman Pontiff had visited an Eastern Catholic church in the United States.  In addition, Ukrainian President Viktor Yushchenko and his wife paid a state visit to the Archeparchy and the Cathedral in 2005.

Metropolia of Philadelphia for the Ukrainians

The archeparchy is the metropolitan see of the Ukrainian Catholic Metropolia of Philadelphia. The archeparchy has three suffragan eparchies: Saint Josaphat in Parma, Saint Nicholas of Chicago, and Stamford.

Parishes
The archeparchy governs parishes in the following states:
Delaware
District of Columbia
Maryland
New Jersey
Pennsylvania (eastern counties)
Virginia

See also

Ukrainian Catholic National Shrine of the Holy Family
List of the Catholic cathedrals of the United States
List of the Catholic dioceses of the United States
:Category:Catholic dioceses in the United States (including ecclesiastical provinces)
Roman Catholic Archdiocese of Philadelphia
Ukrainian Catholic Church
List of bishops
Ivan Volansky

References

Sources
Catholic-Hierarchy.org
History of the Metropolia (Ukrainian Catholic Archeparchy of Philadelphia official website)
Ukrainian Catholic Cathedral of the Immaculate Conception

External links
Ukrainian Catholic Archeparchy of Philadelphia Official Site

Philadelphia
Philadelphia
Christian organizations established in 1913
Ukrainian-American culture in Pennsylvania
Ukrainian-American culture in Maryland
Ukrainian-American culture in New Jersey
Ukrainian-American culture in Washington, D.C.
Philadelphia
Poplar, Philadelphia
1913 establishments in Pennsylvania
Ukrainian-American culture in Philadelphia